St. John's College, Colombo (Sinhala : ශාන්ත ජෝන් විද්‍යාලය) is a Government school for boys which is hosted by Western Provincial Council. In here about 1,100+ students are studying. This school was established on 16 January 1939 by Rev. Maurice John Legoc. The first principal was B. Wean Sander.

External links 
 
 Official Blog of School's Media Unit

Schools in Colombo
Provincial schools in Sri Lanka
Boys' schools in Sri Lanka
Educational institutions established in 1939
1939 establishments in Ceylon